K. Yuthan Balaji is an Indian actor who has appeared in Tamil language films. He made his debut in the 2009 film, Pattalam produced by N. Linguswamy, before featuring as the lead actor in Kaadhal Solla Vandhen (2010) and Nagarvalam (2017).

Career
After appearing the successful Vijay TV school drama television serial Kana Kaanum Kaalangal, Balaji and several of his co-stars were cast the lead actors of Rohan Krishna's coming-of-age drama film Pattalam (2009). Produced by N. Linguswamy and featuring Nadhiya Moidu in a key role, the film did not perform as well as anticipated at the box office. He was then selected to play the lead role in Boopathy Pandian's Kaadhal Solla Vandhen (2010) after the film went through a change of cast. Starring opposite Meghana Raj, the film had a wide release across Tamil Nadu. He then appeared in Meiyyazhagi (2013) portraying a man with celebral palsy and the film had a low-profile release and received mixed reviews.

He made a comeback through a romantic thriller film titled Nagarvalam in 2017, and changed his stagename from Balaji Balakrishnan to Yuthan Balaji.

With a few films where he plays chocolate boy role in his kitty, Yuthan Balaji has opted for a high action web series in the late 2018 and taken the avatar of a gangster in Vella Raja.

Filmography
All films are in Tamil, unless otherwise noted.

Television
Star Vijay - Kana Kaanum Kaalangal (2006) as Joseph
Zee Tamizh - Dance Jodi Dance (2016) as Yuthan

Web series
Vella Raja (2018) as Kathir

References

External links 

 

1987 births
Living people
Indian Tamil people
Indian male film actors
Male actors from Chennai
Male actors in Tamil cinema
20th-century Indian male actors
Tamil male actors
Loyola College, Chennai alumni
21st-century Indian male actors